El Talladell is a locality and decentralized municipal entity located in the municipality of Tàrrega, in Province of Lleida province, Catalonia, Spain. As of 2020, it has a population of 231.

Geography 
El Talladell is located 58km east of Lleida.

References

Populated places in the Province of Lleida